Jungnyeong Tunnel, (also spelled Jukryeong Tunnel or Jungryeong Tunnel), is one of Korea's longest tunnels with a length of 4.6 kilometers. This tunnel carries the Jungang Expressway, an expressway running through central South Korea. It connects Yeongju City with Danyang County. It was opened by the National Highway Corporation.

References 

Road tunnels in South Korea
Tunnels completed in 2002
Buildings and structures in North Gyeongsang Province
Transport in North Gyeongsang Province
Yeongju
Buildings and structures in North Chungcheong Province
Transport in North Chungcheong Province
Danyang County
2002 establishments in South Korea
Jungang Expressway